Livinus van de Bundt was a Dutch artist, who called himself Livinus. Initially a painter and graphic artist, he was the founder of an art academy and later became a pioneer of light art and video art.

Biography
Livinus Arie Cornelis Jan van de Bundt was born 5 March 1909 in Zeist. His father was Jan van de Bundt (1887–1970), his mother Sijgje Cornelia van der Vlies (1885–1961). Livinus had two sisters, Corry and Kiki.

Livinus started painting aged 14. From 1929 to 1931 he worked for Koninklijke Begeer. He enrolled at the Koninklijke Academie van Beeldende Kunsten in The Hague in 1932, but left prematurely in 1934 after a number of conflicts. In 1937 he went to Paris to study with Stanley Hayter at Atelier 17 for a year.

A 1938 exhibition of his abstract work was not well received, provoking him to destroy his work. At age 30 he gave up painting, unable to achieve the brilliance he envisaged. For several years he produced only graphic work in black and white.

During World War II Livinus van de Bundt applied his graphic skills to forge passports. In 1947 he founded the Vrije Academie voor Beeldende Kunsten in The Hague and remained its director until 1964. His work was also part of the painting event in the art competition at the 1948 Summer Olympics.

He started working with light, using a variety of materials. His chronopeintures contained illuminated pieces of colored plastic. Livinus' secretive luminodynamical machine, built in the 1950s from lenses, bulbs and electronic components, enabled the operator to generate color effects using a keyboard. He built a drum kit which triggered light effects when hit.

Van de Bundt married Mieke van der Burgt (18 April 1917–9 June 1979), herself an artist working in graphics, ceramics and textiles. The pair had a daughter, Livina van de Bundt, and a son, Jeep van de Bundt, who became an artist, musician and later a classic car dealer.

In 1970, while on a visit to Intermedia in Vancouver, Livinus started experimenting with video. He produced several video art projects, together with his son.

Livinus van de Bundt died 11 October 1979 in The Hague.

Works
Incomplete list of extant and lost works:

 Nederland 1943. Zes naaldgravures (1944). Set of six engravings. Clandestinely published by Vijf Ponden Pers, Amsterdam, during the German occupation of the Netherlands. Edition of 55.

 A Chronopeinture (1964) as well as several black and white graphical works by Livinus are in the collection of the Stedelijk Museum, Amsterdam.

 Light Carillon (1967). Placed on the roof of a municipal office building in Arnhem, this was an irregularly shaped, 12 meter high, concrete structure, illuminated in a dynamically changing pattern of colors, with the changing colors announcing the time every quarter of an hour. The installation was built around the building's concrete elevator shaft, with protruding strips covered in fluorescent paint. Placed around it were 216 red, green, yellow, and violet spotlights, each 150W, which were activated by switches, controlled by a punched tape.The lights were switched off during the 1973 oil crisis to save electricity, and would never function again. Despite protests the installation was demolished in 1998.

 Several video works produced by Livinus with his son Jeep are in the LIMA-collection:
 Discovisie: C.R.M. Stroken 1, Discovisie: C.R.M. Stroken 2, and Discovisie: C.R.M. Stroken 3 (1975), 3:00 each
 Moiré (1975) 6:12
 Percussie VI (1977) 2:13

Exhibitions

Solo exhibitions
 Fotopeinture19 December 1958 – 19 January 1959Stedelijk Museum, AmsterdamIllustrated catalog with text in Dutch and English

 Livinus van de Bundt schildert met licht 13 August 1965 – 24 October 1965Gemeentemuseum, Arnhem

 De Vluchtkoffer van Livinus 15 January 2011 –  6 February 2011GEMAK, The Hague

Group exhibitions
 Kunst-Licht-Kunst 25 September 1966 – 4 December 1966Stedelijk van Abbemuseum, Eindhoven

 Classic Video Art 21 October 2017 – 10 December 2017Museum Hilversum

Awards
Van de Bundt was awarded the 1964 Sikkens Prize for his fotopeintures. In 1965 he received the Soclair prize for his ''Optochrome constructie variabel 40 b 3.

Bibliography

See also
 Louis Bertrand Castel, who in 1725 invented the ocular harpsichord.
 Thomas Wilfred, created light art which he called lumia.

Notes and references

External links
 
 

1909 births
1979 deaths
Dutch video artists
Light artists
20th-century Dutch artists
Olympic competitors in art competitions